Ayyur is a village in the vadippatti taluk of Madurai district, Tamil Nadu, India.

Demographics 
As per the 2001 census, Ayyur had a total population of 3,619 with 1,794 males and 1,825 females.

References 

Villages in Ariyalur district